The Danish Ministry of Social Affairs was re-created in 2010 as a split of the Social Welfare ministry created after the 2007 Folketing elections. The split moved the section that had to do with the Ministry of the Interior off into the Ministry of the Interior and Health. The current minister is Pernille Rosenkrantz-Theil.

List of ministers

Notes

External links
Official website

Social Affairs
Society of Denmark
Denmark
Ministries established in 2007